Sportske novosti awards refer to annual sports awards given by Sportske novosti, a Zagreb-based Croatian daily sports newspaper. The awards originated in the 1950s and went on to become one of the most prestigious Croatian awards in sports. The winners are decided by polling sports journalists.

History
Sportske novosti was founded in 1945 and it first began awarding the Yugoslav Sportsman of the Year and Yugoslav Sportswoman of the Year awards in 1950 for greatest achievements in Yugoslav sports. The award, one of several Yugoslav national-level sporting awards, was given every year between 1950 and 1990, when it was discontinued due to the breakup of Yugoslavia.

In 1952 the newspaper launched a parallel award for Croatian athletes which honored best sporting achievements by athletes hailing from SR Croatia (1952–90). Following Croatia's independence, the Yugoslav competition was discontinued, while the Croatian category was kept to the present day. In 1966 a separate category was introduced honoring best Yugoslav sports team, and in 1973 the award was split into separate categories for men's and women's team sports. 

Since inception, all awards are selected through a poll of sports journalists from around the country who are members of the Croatian Association of Sports Journalists (Hrvatski zbor sportskih novinara), the national professional association for sports writers established in 1949. 

Award winners in all categories are collectively referred to as the "Golden Roll" (Zlatna lista), and the winners are usually announced in early January for the preceding year. It is considered one of the two most prestigious sporting awards in Croatia, on par with the annual awards handed out by the Croatian Olympic Committee.

Among men, winners with most individual awards won include table tennis player Dragutin Šurbek, tennis star Goran Ivanišević, and skier Ivica Kostelić, with five awards each. As for women, the record holder is discus thrower Sandra Perković with nine wins, followed by skier Janica Kostelić with eight, and high jumper Blanka Vlašić with six awards.

Athlete of the Year

Yugoslav competition (1950–1990)

Croatian competition (1952–present)

Sportsman of the Year

Sportswoman of the Year

By sport
This table lists the total number of awards for individual sportsmen and sportswomen by recipients' sporting profession.

Team of the Year

1966–1990

1990–present

See also
 Golden Badge - Award for Yugoslav (and later Serbian) Athlete of the Year, awarded by the Belgrade-based sports daily Sport since 1957.

References
 Award winners 

Sport in Croatia
Croatia
Croatian awards
Lists of sportspeople
Lists of award winners
Croatia sport-related lists
Awards established in 1950
Awards disestablished in 1991
Awards established in 1952
1950 establishments in Yugoslavia
1952 establishments in Croatia